The Bay of Bourgneuf is a bay situated on the French Atlantic coast, at the border of the Loire-Atlantique and Vendée departments. In the Middle Ages the bay was known as the baie de Bretagne or baye de Bretagne (Bay of Brittany or Brittany Bay).

The  bay of Bourgneuf is a vast maritime arc on the French Atlantic coast running from the Pointe Saint-Gildas (south of the Loire estuary) to Beauvoir-sur-Mer and is enclosed by the island of Noirmoutier up to the île du Pilier. It thus includes the south coast of the Pays de Retz, the shore of the Marais breton ('Breton Marshes') and the east coast of Noirmoutier, the latter being connected to the mainland by the notable Passage du Gois and, to the south, the bay connects to the north of the Bay of Biscay by the Strait of Fromentine, crossed by the Noirmoutier Bridge since 1971.

Until the Middle Ages the bay extended over a far greater area. Its shores reached the ports of Machecoul and Challans and was dotted with several islands, notably the Isle of Bouin. Silting of the bed of the bay followed by the creation of the polders and salt pans of the Marais Breton and Noirmoutier, significantly reducing the bay's area.

Climate 
The isle of Noirmoutier encloses and shelters the bay and gives it a milder climate. It shares the relatively sunny exposure of the area south of the Loire. At Moutiers en Retz, July and August are the warmest months and January the coldest. Summers are relatively dry. In winter, snow is infrequent as are periods of intense cold. Overall, annual sunshine is high for the region (over 2000 hours per year) including winter. Autumns are often wet due to coastal storms, even if sunny days remain frequent.
The climate is submediterranean in the Gaussen climate classification having one dry month (P < 2 × T). According to the Köppen climate classification, the climate is Oceanic climate Cfb.

History 
The Marais breton in the bay, became a major  salt producer in Brittany, France and Europe in the 15th and 16th centuries.  The bay bore witness to this activity, such as at the port of Collet, where ships from the Hanseatic League came to load grey salt.

The prosperity of the towns of the bay declined in the 18th century with the reduction of trade due to the silting that hampered production and the navigation of large vessels. Silting remains an ongoing issue, due mainly to alluvial sediments from the Loire to the north.

Bourgneuf en Retz, Machecoul, Challans, Beauvoir-sur-Mer, were formerly sea ports on the shores of the Bay of Bourgneuf. The limit of the ancient shoreline can be discerned today as the line of demarcation between bocage and marshland, such as the Marais Poitevin

The 1799 Vendée earthquake, centred between Noirmouitier and Bouin in the south of the bay, estimated at force 6.5, caused widespread damage.

Smuggling 
Under the Ancien Régime, this region was the centre of a significant smuggling operation operated by the coureurs de lune (moon runners) who trafficked illegal tobacco, salt, wines, liquour, and Indiennes, on foot, horseback or aboard three-masted lighters known as "chattes", constantly trying to evade capture by customs officers. This traffic was rife and directly or indirectly affected the whole population. 

Smuggling was principally operated from the isles of Bouin, Noirmoutier and île d'Yeu, exacerbated by the islands' tax-exempt status at the time.

Principal ports 

 Pointe Saint-Gildas
 Pornic :
 Port de la Noëveillard
 Le Vieux-port
 Moutiers-en-Retz :
 Port du Collet
 Bouin : 
 Port des Brochets
 Port des Champs
 Port du Bec
 La Barre-de-Monts :
 Fromentine
 Noirmoutier-en-l'Île
 Vieux port
 L'Herbaudière

Flora and Fauna 
According to  Natura 2000, the Marais Breton forms part of a larger geographic zone which also includes the Pays-de-Monts National Forest and the island of Noirmoutier.
In 2017 this zone was rated 2, wetland zone of international importance under the Ramsar Convention.

See also

Bibliography

Related articles 

 Pays de Retz
 Smuggling
 Bourgneuf-en-Retz
 Noirmoutier
 Côte de Jade
 Marais breton
 Passage du Gois

References 

Landforms of Loire-Atlantique
Landforms of Vendée
Bays of the Atlantic Ocean
Bays of Metropolitan France
Ramsar sites in Metropolitan France